Rare Silk was an American vocal jazz group that was active during the 1980s.

MaryLynn Gillaspie and her sister, Gaile, grew up in southern California. Their father played trumpet, and from an early age they heard big band music and Ella Fitzgerald. In 1978, they were working as waitresses in Boulder, Colorado, with Gaile also singing at a local club. After they met another singer, Marguerite Juenemann, they formed Rare Silk. They sang on a local radio station and in clubs, sometimes dressed like the Andrews Sisters.

In 1980, they were the opening act for Benny Goodman at the 1980 Playboy Jazz Festival. They recorded their first album, New Weave, in 1983. This album was nominated for two Grammy Awards. It was followed by American Eyes, which was released in 1985, and Black and Blue, in 1986.

Juenemann left the group and was replaced by Barbara Reeves and then by Jamie Broumas. The band broke up in 1988.

Discography
 New Weave (Polydor, 1983)
 American Eyes (Palo Alto, 1985)
 Black and Blue (1986)

References

American jazz ensembles
Palo Alto Records artists
Polydor Records artists
American vocal groups
Vocal jazz ensembles